Ben Jackson, also known by his pseudonym Karma, is a former professional Halo player from Murrieta, California, United States. He attended Murrieta Valley High School. He started playing Halo intensively when Halo 2 was announced and widespread promotion of the Xbox 360 commenced.

Professional gaming
At age seventeen, in May 2005, Jackson became a professional Major League Gaming (MLG) Halo 2 gamer. After an initial period as a part-time player with Team Carbon, Jackson became a full-time member in late 2005. At the 2005 MLG National Championship in New York City, Jackson became the MLG National Free-For-All (FFA) Champion for Halo 2 and remained unbeaten throughout the 2006 MLG season, leading to another title.

Tournament results

Carbon
 1st - MLG Las Vegas National Championships 2006 (4v4 and FFA)

References

External links
Esports Amped - Boss Battle: Carbon vs. FB
NY Times Gaming Guru video

Living people
People from Murrieta, California
American esports players
Halo (franchise) players
Date of birth missing (living people)
Carbon (Halo team) players
Year of birth missing (living people)